Faaite, or Faaiti is an atoll of the Tuamotus in French Polynesia. The total population  is 401 inhabitants.

Faaite's inner lagoon has a navigable channel to the ocean. The main village is Hitianau, with a total population of 246.

History

The first recorded sighting of the atoll by Europeans was by the Spanish expedition of Pedro Fernández de Quirós on 11 February 1606. It was charted as Decena (ten in Spanish). John Turnbull rediscovered it in 1802. Turnbull was the first retailer of the Pacific who used the route of Tahiti to Hawaii. Russian oceanic explorer Fabian Gottlieb von Bellingshausen visited Faaite in 1820 on the ships Vostok and Mirni. He named this atoll "Miloradovich".

On September 2, 1987 six islanders were thrown into a fire and burned alive in an exorcism ceremony incited by an American religious group, the "Charismatic Renewal Cult".

Administration
Administratively Faaite belongs to the commune of Anaa, which includes the inhabited atoll of Faaite and the uninhabited atolls of Tahanea and Motutunga.

Transport
The island is connected to the world via Faaite Airport.

References

Bruno Saura, Les bûchers de Faaite: paganisme ancestral ou dérapage chrétien en Polynésie française, Cobalt/Editions de l'après midi. Paris 1990

Atolls of the Tuamotus